Model Christian College in Kohima Nagaland, India was established in 2007 by Arücho Society for Human Transformation and Research. It is affiliated with Nagaland University.

Courses offered 
 English
 Botany
 Zoology
 Chemistry
 Geology
 Geography
 Education
 Political Science
 Sociology
 History

References

Education in Kohima
Universities and colleges in Nagaland
Colleges affiliated to Nagaland University
Kohima
2007 establishments in Nagaland
Educational institutions established in 2007